Reverend Anthony J. Motley is an American religious and community leader from Southeast Washington, D.C.

He received his formal education in the District of Columbia Public Schools, graduating from the Anacostia High School. He served two tours of duty with US military. Motley earned a Master of Divinity from the Howard University School of Divinity, and a Bachelor of Arts in Communications from the University of Detroit.

In 2001 Reverend Motley worked to form what is now the J.O.B.S. Coalition of Greater Washington.

References

External links
 "Speak to my Heart: Communities of Faith and Contemporary African American Life.", Interview with Rev. and Mrs. Anthony Motley , Anacostia Museum and Center for African American History and Culture

American chief executives
Howard University alumni
Living people
Year of birth missing (living people)
University of Detroit Mercy alumni